Victoria Fletcher (born 1993) is an Australian team handball player. She plays on the Australian national team, and participated at the 2011 World Women's Handball Championship in Brazil.

References

1993 births
Living people
Australian female handball players
Handball players at the 2010 Summer Youth Olympics